The 1991 Hamilton municipal election was a municipal election held on November 12, 1994, to select one Regional Chairman, one Mayor, two alderman for each of the city's eight wards for a total of sixteen members of the Hamilton, Ontario City Council, and members of both English and French Public and Catholic School Boards. This election marked one of the most stunning turnovers in local history, with four incumbent aldermen being defeated by political newcomers and Ward 3 Alderman Brian Hinkley being soundly defeated in his bid for the mayoralty against incumbent Mayor Bob Morrow.

Regional Chairman Election

|-
!rowspan="2" colspan="2"|Candidate
!colspan="3"|Popular vote
|-
! Votes
! %
! ±%
|-
| style="background-color:#56A0D3;" |
| style="text-align:left;" | Reg Whynott (Incumbent)
| style="text-align:right;" |54,464
| style="text-align:right;" |64.77%
| style="text-align:right;" |+29.74%
|-
| style="background-color:#4F7942;" |
| style="text-align:left;" | Janice Wilson
| style="text-align:right;" |12,139
| style="text-align:right;" |14.44%
| style="text-align:right;" |n/a
|-
| style="background-color:#FB607F;" |
| style="text-align:left;" | Julie Tozzi
| style="text-align:right;" |9,340
| style="text-align:right;" |11.11%
| style="text-align:right;" |n/a
|-
| style="background-color:#00A550;" |
| style="text-align:left;" | Eiflon Ivor Wynne
| style="text-align:right;" |4,632
| style="text-align:right;" |5.51%
| style="text-align:right;" |n/a
|-
| style="background-color:#B7410E;" |
| style="text-align:left;" | Gerard Marchildon
| style="text-align:right;" |3,516
| style="text-align:right;" |4.18%
| style="text-align:right;" |n/a
|-
| style="text-align:right;background-color:#FFFFFF;" colspan="2" |Total Votes
| style="text-align:right;background-color:#FFFFFF;" |84,091
| style="text-align:right;background-color:#FFFFFF;" |100%
| style="text-align:right;background-color:#FFFFFF;" |
|- 
| style="text-align:right;background-color:#FFFFFF;" colspan="2" |Registered Voters
| style="text-align:right;background-color:#FFFFFF;" |n/a
| style="text-align:right;background-color:#FFFFFF;" |n/a
| style="text-align:right;background-color:#FFFFFF;" |n/a
|- 
| style="text-align:left;" colspan="6" |Note: All Hamilton Municipal Elections are officially non-partisan.  Note: Candidate campaign colours are based on the prominent colour used in campaign items (signs, literature, etc.)and are used as a visual differentiation between candidates.
|- 
| style="text-align:left;" colspan="13" |Sources: Poling, Jim. "Whynott strolls to easy win in race for chair," Hamilton Spectator, Wednesday, November 13,1991, Metro, B1.
|}

Mayoral Election

In late October, an article ran in the Hamilton Spectator critiquing the mayor for what was perceived as political self-aggrandizing while noting that his 1988–1991 term was marked by successes for the city. In the piece, Morrow noted that he felt his strongest competition would come from Ward 3 Alderman Brian Hinkley, a New Democrat with an extensive record at city hall.

In early debates, most notably one hosted by Hamilton's Junior Chamber of Commerce, Hinkley was an aggressive opponent of Morrow's leadership style, accusing the mayor of "over-promising and under-delivering to the community." Morrow attacked Hinkley for his ties to the New Democrats and his stance on the Red Hill Valley Parkway.

Hinkley focused his campaign on the lack of real choice offered to Hamiltonian voters in past elections, even running with the slogan, "This time you have a real choice." Widely critiqued in local media for leading what was known as the "Gang of Four" New Democratic caucus on council, Hinkley gained a reputation as a strong worker with community-based issues, relating well with constituents and ensuring that Hamilton's marginalized people had a voice at the decision making table.

For his part in the race, Michael Baldasaro attempted to repeat his 1988 success, garnering over 7,500 votes against Morrow. Baldasaro announced he would be creating political trading cards for his campaign, though there was no follow-up as to the status of the project. Though he was contesting the mayoral election, a disciple of his Church of the Universe sought election in Ward 6, dividing Baldasro and campaign manager Walter Tucker's attention.

Political newcomer Bill Jones as, at the time, a 30-year-old employee of Dofasco, was less than enthusiastic about his chances, telling the Spectator he did not expect to win, rather make a statement about the state of Hamilton's politics at the time. Jones was not affiliated with any political party, and had not sought elected office before entering the race for mayor. An advocate of more direct democracy, Jones wanted to cut the mayor's salary and put constituent needs ahead of political goals. When asked why he did not seek the open aldermanic seat in Ward 3 where he lived, Jones said that he felt the mayor would have more say.

|-
!rowspan="2" colspan="2"|Candidate
!colspan="3"|Popular vote
|-
! Votes
! %
! ±%
|-
| style="background-color:#9BDDFF;" |
| style="text-align:left;" | Robert Morrow (Incumbent)
| style="text-align:right;" |68,374
| style="text-align:right;" |75.35%
| style="text-align:right;" |n/a
|-
| style="background-color:#FF7F00;" |
| style="text-align:left;" | Brian Hinkley
| style="text-align:right;" |17,143
| style="text-align:right;" |18.89%
| style="text-align:right;" |n/a
|-
| style="background-color:#ACE1AF;" |
| style="text-align:left;" | Bill Jones
| style="text-align:right;" |2,723
| style="text-align:right;" |3.0%
| style="text-align:right;" |n/a
|-
| style="background-color:#69359C;" |
| style="text-align:left;" | Michael Baldasaro
| style="text-align:right;" |2,507
| style="text-align:right;" |2.8%
| style="text-align:right;" |n/a
|-
| style="text-align:right;background-color:#FFFFFF;" colspan="2" |Total votes
| style="text-align:right;background-color:#FFFFFF;" |90,747
| style="text-align:right;background-color:#FFFFFF;" |100%
| style="text-align:right;background-color:#FFFFFF;" |
|- 
| style="text-align:right;background-color:#FFFFFF;" colspan="2" |Registered voters
| style="text-align:right;background-color:#FFFFFF;" |n/a
| style="text-align:right;background-color:#FFFFFF;" |n/a
| style="text-align:right;background-color:#FFFFFF;" |n/a
|- 
| style="text-align:left;" colspan="6" |Note: All Hamilton Municipal Elections are officially non-partisan.  Note: Candidate campaign colours are based on the prominent colour used in campaign items (signs, literature, etc.)and are used as a visual differentiation between candidates.
|- 
| style="text-align:left;" colspan="13" |Sources: Peters, Ken. "Morrow took freeway to victory", Hamilton Spectator, Wednesday, November 13, 1991, Metro, B1.
|}

City Council election

Ward One (West Hamilton-McMaster)

|-
!rowspan="2" colspan="2"|Candidate
!colspan="3"|Popular vote
|-
! Votes
! %
! ±%
|-
| style="background-color:#E4D00A;" |
| style="text-align:left;" | Terry Cooke (incumbent)
| style="text-align:right;" |6,969
| style="text-align:right;" |64.53%
| style="text-align:right;" |+21.44%
|-
| style="background-color:#00563F;" |
| style="text-align:left;" | Mary Kiss (incumbent)
| style="text-align:right;" |5,608
| style="text-align:right;" |49.15%
| style="text-align:right;" |+12.51%
|-
| style="background-color:#FF3800;" |
| style="text-align:left;" | Charles Renauld
| style="text-align:right;" |2,542
| style="text-align:right;" |23.54%
| style="text-align:right;" |n/a
|-
| style="background-color:#FF9966;" |
| style="text-align:left;" | Joyce Lowe
| style="text-align:right;" |1,409
| style="text-align:right;" |13.05%
| style="text-align:right;" |n/a
|-
| style="background-color:#C9A0DC;" |
| style="text-align:left;" | Pat Ielasi
| style="text-align:right;" |983
| style="text-align:right;" |9.1%
| style="text-align:right;" |n/a
|-
| style="text-align:right;background-color:#FFFFFF;" colspan="2" |Total votes
| style="text-align:right;background-color:#FFFFFF;" |10,799
| style="text-align:right;background-color:#FFFFFF;" |Note 1
| style="text-align:right;background-color:#FFFFFF;" |
|-
| style="text-align:right;background-color:#FFFFFF;" colspan="2" |Registered voters
| style="text-align:right;background-color:#FFFFFF;" |n/a
| style="text-align:right;background-color:#FFFFFF;" | 
| style="text-align:right;background-color:#FFFFFF;" |n/a
|-
| style="text-align:left;" colspan="6" |Note 1: Each ward elected two aldermen and percentages are specific to each candidate, not for the overall total.Note 2: All Hamilton Municipal Elections are officially non-partisan.  Note 3: Candidate campaign colours are based on the prominent colour used in campaign items (signs, literature, etc.)and are used as a visual differentiation between candidates.
|-
| style="text-align:left;" colspan="13" |Sources: Morrison, Suzanne. "Incumbents win in a cakewalk", Hamilton Spectator,Wednesday, November 13, 1991, Metro, B1.

|}

Ward Two (Downtown)

|-
!rowspan="2" colspan="2"|Candidate
!colspan="3"|Popular vote
|-
! Votes
! %
! ±%
|-
| style="background-color:#FF0000;" |
| style="text-align:left;" | Vince Agro (incumbent)
| style="text-align:right;" |3,643
| style="text-align:right;" |44.15%
| style="text-align:right;" |-5.63%
|-
| style="background-color:#002E63;" |
| style="text-align:left;" | Bill McCulloch (incumbent)
| style="text-align:right;" |2,851
| style="text-align:right;" |34.55%
| style="text-align:right;" |-13.61%
|-
| style="background-color:#96C8A2;" |
| style="text-align:left;" | Peter Hill
| style="text-align:right;" |2,408
| style="text-align:right;" |29.18%
| style="text-align:right;" |n/a
|-
| style="background-color:#FFA700;" |
| style="text-align:left;" | William Laidlaw
| style="text-align:right;" |1,938
| style="text-align:right;" |23.49%
| style="text-align:right;" |-11.92%
|-
| style="background-color:#3EB489;" |
| style="text-align:left;" | Brian Morris
| style="text-align:right;" |763
| style="text-align:right;" |9.25%
| style="text-align:right;" |n/a
|-
| style="background-color:#F3E5AB;" |
| style="text-align:left;" | Dolores Marks
| style="text-align:right;" |617
| style="text-align:right;" |7.48%
| style="text-align:right;" |n/a
|-
| style="background-color:#FF0000;" |
| style="text-align:left;" | Bob Mann
| style="text-align:right;" |505
| style="text-align:right;" |6.12%
| style="text-align:right;" |n/a
|-
| style="text-align:right;background-color:#FFFFFF;" colspan="2" |Total votes
| style="text-align:right;background-color:#FFFFFF;" |8,252
| style="text-align:right;background-color:#FFFFFF;" |Note 1
| style="text-align:right;background-color:#FFFFFF;" |
|- 
| style="text-align:right;background-color:#FFFFFF;" colspan="2" |Registered voters
| style="text-align:right;background-color:#FFFFFF;" |28,848
| style="text-align:right;background-color:#FFFFFF;" |30.44%
| style="text-align:right;background-color:#FFFFFF;" |n/a
|- 
| style="text-align:left;" colspan="6" |Note 1: Each ward elected two aldermen and percentages are specific to each candidate, not for the overall total.Note 2: All Hamilton Municipal Elections are officially non-partisan.  Note 3: Candidate campaign colours are based on the prominent colour used in campaign items (signs, literature, etc.)and are used as a visual differentiation between candidates.
|- 
| style="text-align:left;" colspan="13" |Sources: MacPhail, Wayne. "Veteran savours 'last' victory", Hamilton Spectator,Wednesday, November 13, 1991, Metro, B2.

|}

Ward Three (East Hamilton-Stipley)

|-
!rowspan="2" colspan="2"|Candidate
!colspan="3"|Popular vote
|-
! Votes
! %
! ±%
|-
| style="background-color:#FF0000;" |
| style="text-align:left;" | Don Drury (incumbent)
| style="text-align:right;" |5,123
| style="text-align:right;" |51.98%
| style="text-align:right;" |n/a
|-
| style="background-color:#FF0000;" |
| style="text-align:left;" | Bernie Morelli
| style="text-align:right;" |3,505
| style="text-align:right;" |35.56%
| style="text-align:right;" |n/a
|-
| style="background-color:#009900;" |
| style="text-align:left;" | Doreen Johnson
| style="text-align:right;" |1,868
| style="text-align:right;" |18.95%
| style="text-align:right;" |n/a
|-
| style="background-color:#FF7F00;" |
| style="text-align:left;" | Alan Whittle
| style="text-align:right;" |1,271
| style="text-align:right;" |12.90%
| style="text-align:right;" |n/a
|-
| style="background-color:#F0DC82;" |
| style="text-align:left;" | Fabio Chiapetta
| style="text-align:right;" |906
| style="text-align:right;" |9.51%
| style="text-align:right;" |n/a
|-
| style="background-color:#AB4E52;" |
| style="text-align:left;" | John Crawford
| style="text-align:right;" |731
| style="text-align:right;" |9.20%
| style="text-align:right;" |n/a
|-
| style="background-color:#0C371D;" |
| style="text-align:left;" | Edward Partito
| style="text-align:right;" |668
| style="text-align:right;" |6.78%
| style="text-align:right;" |n/a
|-
| style="background-color:#5D8AA8;" |
| style="text-align:left;" | Danny Stanidis
| style="text-align:right;" |525
| style="text-align:right;" |5.33%
| style="text-align:right;" |n/a
|-
| style="background-color:#C32148;" |
| style="text-align:left;" | Roger Lavoie
| style="text-align:right;" |290
| style="text-align:right;" |2.94%
| style="text-align:right;" |n/a
|-
| style="background-color:#99BADD;" |
| style="text-align:left;" | James Steven Faner
| style="text-align:right;" |120
| style="text-align:right;" |1.22%
| style="text-align:right;" |n/a
|-
| style="text-align:right;background-color:#FFFFFF;" colspan="2" |Total votes
| style="text-align:right;background-color:#FFFFFF;" |9,856
| style="text-align:right;background-color:#FFFFFF;" |Note 1
| style="text-align:right;background-color:#FFFFFF;" |
|- 
| style="text-align:right;background-color:#FFFFFF;" colspan="2" |Registered voters
| style="text-align:right;background-color:#FFFFFF;" |n/a
| style="text-align:right;background-color:#FFFFFF;" |n/a
| style="text-align:right;background-color:#FFFFFF;" |n/a
|- 
| style="text-align:left;" colspan="6" |Note 1: Each ward elected two aldermen and percentages are specific to each candidate, not for the overall total.Note 2: All Hamilton Municipal Elections are officially non-partisan.  Note 3: Candidate campaign colours are based on the prominent colour used in campaign items (signs, literature, etc.)and are used as a visual differentiation between candidates.
|- 
| style="text-align:left;" colspan="13" |Sources: Lefaive, Doug. "Newcomer pledges 'vitality, teamwork" Hamilton Spectator, November 13, 1991, Metro, B1.
|}

Ward Four (East Hamilton-Barton)

|-
!rowspan="2" colspan="2"|Candidate
!colspan="3"|Popular vote
|-
! Votes
! %
! ±%
|-
| style="background-color:#FF0000;" |
| style="text-align:left;" | Geraldine Copps (incumbent)
| style="text-align:right;" |6,554
| style="text-align:right;" |66.20%
| style="text-align:right;" |-3.15%
|-
| style="background-color:#FF7F00;" |
| style="text-align:left;" | Dave Wilson (incumbent)
| style="text-align:right;" |4,964
| style="text-align:right;" |50.14%
| style="text-align:right;" |(Note 2) n/a
|-
| style="background-color:#002366;" |
| style="text-align:left;" | Murray Kilgour
| style="text-align:right;" |1,669
| style="text-align:right;" |16.86%
| style="text-align:right;" |n/a
|-
| style="background-color:#32CD32;" |
| style="text-align:left;" | James Monahan
| style="text-align:right;" |1,453
| style="text-align:right;" |14.68%
| style="text-align:right;" |n/a
|-
| style="text-align:right;background-color:#FFFFFF;" colspan="2" |Total votes
| style="text-align:right;background-color:#FFFFFF;" |9,900
| style="text-align:right;background-color:#FFFFFF;" |Note 1
| style="text-align:right;background-color:#FFFFFF;" |
|- 
| style="text-align:right;background-color:#FFFFFF;" colspan="2" |Registered voters
| style="text-align:right;background-color:#FFFFFF;" |n/a
| style="text-align:right;background-color:#FFFFFF;" |n/a
| style="text-align:right;background-color:#FFFFFF;" |n/a
|- 
| style="text-align:left;" colspan="6" |Note 1: Each ward elected two aldermen and percentages are specific to each candidate, not for the overall total.Note 2: Wilson was elected in a 1990 by-election.Note 3: All Hamilton Municipal Elections are officially non-partisan.  Note 4: Candidate campaign colours are based on the prominent colour used in campaign items (signs, literature, etc.)and are used as a visual differentiation between candidates.
|- 
| style="text-align:left;" colspan="13" |Sources: Holt, Jim. ""Copps, Wilson sweep back into office", Hamilton Spectator, November 13, 1991, Metro, B2.

|}

Ward Five (Red Hill-Rosedale)

|-
!rowspan="2" colspan="2"|Candidate
!colspan="3"|Popular vote
|-
! Votes
! %
! ±%
|-
| style="background-color:#FF0000;" |
| style="text-align:left;" | Dominic Agostino (Incumbent)
| style="text-align:right;" |7,697
| style="text-align:right;" |62.35%
| style="text-align:right;" |+1.46%
|-
| style="background-color:#66023C;" |
| style="text-align:left;" | Fred Eisenberger
| style="text-align:right;" |3,191
| style="text-align:right;" |25.85%
| style="text-align:right;" |n/a
|-
| style="background-color:#FF0000;" |
| style="text-align:left;" | Reg Wheeler
| style="text-align:right;" |3,159
| style="text-align:right;" |25.59%
| style="text-align:right;" |n/a
|-
| style="background-color:#002E63;" |
| style="text-align:left;" | Fred Lombardo (Incumbent)
| style="text-align:right;" |2,984
| style="text-align:right;" |24.17%
| style="text-align:right;" |-8.56%
|-
| style="background-color:#6495ED;" |
| style="text-align:left;" | Tommy Tarpos
| style="text-align:right;" |2,178
| style="text-align:right;" |17.64%
| style="text-align:right;" |n/a
|-
| style="background-color:#C19A6B;" |
| style="text-align:left;" | Fiore Manganiello
| style="text-align:right;" |347
| style="text-align:right;" |2.81%
| style="text-align:right;" |n/a
|-
| style="text-align:right;background-color:#FFFFFF;" colspan="2" |Total votes
| style="text-align:right;background-color:#FFFFFF;" |12,344
| style="text-align:right;background-color:#FFFFFF;" |Note 1
| style="text-align:right;background-color:#FFFFFF;" |
|-
| style="text-align:right;background-color:#FFFFFF;" colspan="2" |Registered voters
| style="text-align:right;background-color:#FFFFFF;" |n/a
| style="text-align:right;background-color:#FFFFFF;" |n/a
| style="text-align:right;background-color:#FFFFFF;" |n/a
|-
| style="text-align:left;" colspan="6" |Note 1: Each ward elected two aldermen and percentages are specific to each candidate, not for the overall total.Note 2: All Hamilton Municipal Elections are officially non-partisan.  Note 3: Candidate campaign colours are based on the prominent colour used in campaign items (signs, literature, etc.)and are used as a visual differentiation between candidates.
|-
| style="text-align:left;" colspan="13" |Sources: Elliot, James. "Newcomer Eisenberger wins squeaker", Hamilton Spectator, Wednesday, November 13, 1991, Metro, B2.

|}

Ward Six (East Mountain)

|-
!rowspan="2" colspan="2"|Candidate
!colspan="3"|Popular vote
|-
! Votes
! %
! ±%
|-
| style="background-color:#002E63;" |
| style="text-align:left;" | Tom Jackson (Incumbent)
| style="text-align:right;" |7,916
| style="text-align:right;" |58.55%
| style="text-align:right;" |+4.83%
|-
| style="background-color:#3F00FF;" |
| style="text-align:left;" | Bob Charters
| style="text-align:right;" |3,733
| style="text-align:right;" |27.61%
| style="text-align:right;" |(Note 2) n/a
|-
| style="background-color:#A1CAF1;" |
| style="text-align:left;" | Vince Formosi (Incumbent)
| style="text-align:right;" |3,519
| style="text-align:right;" |26.03%
| style="text-align:right;" |(Note 2) n/a
|-
| style="background-color:#FF7F00;" |
| style="text-align:left;" | Don Clarke
| style="text-align:right;" |2,894
| style="text-align:right;" |21.40%
| style="text-align:right;" |n/a
|-
| style="background-color:#32CD32;" |
| style="text-align:left;" | Greg Peitchinis
| style="text-align:right;" |2,224
| style="text-align:right;" |16.45%
| style="text-align:right;" |n/a
|-
| style="background-color:#663854;" |
| style="text-align:left;" | Charles Eleveld
| style="text-align:right;" |1,355
| style="text-align:right;" |10.02%%
| style="text-align:right;" |(Note 2) n/a
|-
| style="background-color:#8B0000;" |
| style="text-align:left;" | Peter O'Hagan
| style="text-align:right;" |686
| style="text-align:right;" |5.07%
| style="text-align:right;" |-7.11%
|-
| style="background-color:#69359C;" |
| style="text-align:left;" | Daniel Henry Morgan
| style="text-align:right;" |191
| style="text-align:right;" |1.41%
| style="text-align:right;" |n/a
|-
| style="text-align:right;background-color:#FFFFFF;" colspan="2" |Total votes
| style="text-align:right;background-color:#FFFFFF;" |13,521
| style="text-align:right;background-color:#FFFFFF;" |Note 1
| style="text-align:right;background-color:#FFFFFF;" |
|- 
| style="text-align:right;background-color:#FFFFFF;" colspan="2" |Registered voters
| style="text-align:right;background-color:#FFFFFF;" |n/a
| style="text-align:right;background-color:#FFFFFF;" |n/a
| style="text-align:right;background-color:#FFFFFF;" |n/a
|- 
| style="text-align:left;" colspan="6" |Note 1: Each ward elected two aldermen and percentages are specific to each candidate, not for the overall total.Note 2:Formosi, Charters, and Eleveid all contested a 1990 November by-election.Note 3: All Hamilton Municipal Elections are officially non-partisan.  Note 4: Candidate campaign colours are based on the prominent colour used in campaign items (signs, literature, etc.)and are used as a visual differentiation between candidates.
|- 
| style="text-align:left;" colspan="13" |Sources: Humphreys, Adrian. "Jackson sweeps field in landslide win", The Hamilton Spectator, November 13, 1991, Metro, B2.
|}

Ward Seven (Central Mountain)

|-
!rowspan="2" colspan="2"|Candidate
!colspan="3"|Popular vote
|-
! Votes
! %
! ±%
|-
| style="background-color:#00008B;" |
| style="text-align:left;" | Henry Merling (incumbent)
| style="text-align:right;" |8,218
| style="text-align:right;" |50.66%
| style="text-align:right;" |-15.23%
|-
| style="background-color:#6495ED;" |
| style="text-align:left;" | Terry Anderson 
| style="text-align:right;" |7,298
| style="text-align:right;" |45.00%
| style="text-align:right;" |n/a
|-
| style="background-color:#A1CAF1;" |
| style="text-align:left;" | John Gallagher (incumbent)
| style="text-align:right;" |4,118
| style="text-align:right;" |25.38%
| style="text-align:right;" |-25.04%
|-
| style="background-color:#0892D0;" |
| style="text-align:left;" | Michael Ecker
| style="text-align:right;" |3,609
| style="text-align:right;" |22.25%
| style="text-align:right;" |n/a
|-
| style="background-color:#008000;" |
| style="text-align:left;" | Carol O'Hagan
| style="text-align:right;" |3,008
| style="text-align:right;" |18.54%
| style="text-align:right;" |n/a
|-
| style="text-align:right;background-color:#FFFFFF;" colspan="2" |Total votes
| style="text-align:right;background-color:#FFFFFF;" |16,223
| style="text-align:right;background-color:#FFFFFF;" |Note 1
| style="text-align:right;background-color:#FFFFFF;" |
|- 
| style="text-align:right;background-color:#FFFFFF;" colspan="2" |Registered voters
| style="text-align:right;background-color:#FFFFFF;" |n/a
| style="text-align:right;background-color:#FFFFFF;" |n/a
| style="text-align:right;background-color:#FFFFFF;" |n/a
|- 
| style="text-align:left;" colspan="6" |Note 1: Each ward elected two aldermen and percentages are specific to each candidate, not for the overall total.Note 2: All Hamilton Municipal Elections are officially non-partisan.  Note 3: Candidate campaign colours are based on the prominent colour used in campaign items (signs, literature, etc.)and are used as a visual differentiation between candidates.
|- 
| style="text-align:left;" colspan="13" |Sources: Morison, Jill. "'Gallagher blames media for humbling defeat", The Hamilton Spectator, November 13, 1991, Metro, B2.
|}

Ward Eight (West Mountain)

|-
!rowspan="2" colspan="2"|Candidate
!colspan="3"|Popular vote
|-
! Votes
! %
! ±%
|-
| style="background-color:#00008B;" |
| style="text-align:left;" | Don Ross (incumbent)
| style="text-align:right;" |8,407
| style="text-align:right;" |55.67%
| style="text-align:right;" |+9.06%
|-
| style="background-color:#FF0000;" |
| style="text-align:left;" | Frank D'Amico
| style="text-align:right;" |6,524
| style="text-align:right;" |43.20%
| style="text-align:right;" |n/a
|-
| style="background-color:#8DB600;" |
| style="text-align:left;" | Tom Murray (incumbent)
| style="text-align:right;" |4,813
| style="text-align:right;" |31.87%
| style="text-align:right;" |-13.17%
|-
| style="background-color:#FF0000;" |
| style="text-align:left;" | Mike Oddi
| style="text-align:right;" |2,438
| style="text-align:right;" |16.14%
| style="text-align:right;" |-2.16%
|-
| style="background-color:#32CD32;" |
| style="text-align:left;" | John Ross
| style="text-align:right;" |2,128
| style="text-align:right;" |14.09%
| style="text-align:right;" |n/a
|-
| style="background-color:#A1CAF1;" |
| style="text-align:left;" | John Lewis
| style="text-align:right;" |546
| style="text-align:right;" |3.62%
| style="text-align:right;" |-6.08%
|-
| style="text-align:right;background-color:#FFFFFF;" colspan="2" |Total votes
| style="text-align:right;background-color:#FFFFFF;" |15,102
| style="text-align:right;background-color:#FFFFFF;" |Note 1
| style="text-align:right;background-color:#FFFFFF;" |
|- 
| style="text-align:right;background-color:#FFFFFF;" colspan="2" |Registered voters
| style="text-align:right;background-color:#FFFFFF;" |n/a
| style="text-align:right;background-color:#FFFFFF;" |n/a
| style="text-align:right;background-color:#FFFFFF;" |n/a
|- 
| style="text-align:left;" colspan="6" |Note 1: Each ward elected two aldermen and percentages are specific to each candidate, not for the overall total.Note 2: All Hamilton Municipal Elections are officially non-partisan.  Note 3: Candidate campaign colours are based on the prominent colour used in campaign items (signs, literature, etc.)and are used as a visual differentiation between candidates.
|- 
| style="text-align:left;" colspan="13" |Sources: Benedetti, Paul. "'Political bully' gets a sound thrashing", The Hamilton Spectator, November 13, 1991, Metro, B2.
|}

See also
List of Hamilton, Ontario municipal elections

References

1991 Ontario municipal elections
1991